Matt Nelson (born December 19, 1995) is an American football offensive tackle for the Detroit Lions of the National Football League (NFL). He played college football at Iowa.

High school career 
Nelson attended high school at Cedar Rapids Xavier. He was a three-year letterman in basketball and two-year letterman in football, playing tight end and defensive end. Nelson held Division I basketball offers, including from Rice, and several FBS offers, including from Stanford, Iowa, Notre Dame, Arkansas, and Wisconsin. Xavier reached the state 4-A final back-to-back, with Nelson earning All-State honors. He committed to Iowa in June 2013.

College career
Nelson was a defensive lineman for the Iowa Hawkeyes for five seasons, redshirting as a true freshman. Playing both defensive end and defensive tackle, Nelson finished his collegiate career with 111 tackles, 12 tackles for loss, nine sacks, nine pass break-ups, and one forced fumble. Nelson was a four-time academic all-Big Ten, and earned honorable mention all-Big Ten honors his senior season.

Professional career
After going undrafted in 2019, Nelson was signed by the Detroit Lions as an undrafted free agent with the intention of moving him to the offensive line. He was waived during final roster cuts, but was re-signed to the Lions practice squad and spent the rest of the season there as he adjusted to the offensive line. Nelson made the team out of training camp in 2020. Nelson made his NFL debut in the season opener on September 13, 2020, against the Chicago Bears.

Nelson was given an exclusive-rights free agent tender by the Lions on March 4, 2021. He signed the one-year contract on April 19.

On March 14, 2023, the Detroit Lions re-signed Nelson.

References

External links
Iowa Hawkeyes bio
Detroit Lions bio

1995 births
Living people
Players of American football from Iowa
American football offensive tackles
Iowa Hawkeyes football players
Detroit Lions players
American football defensive tackles
Sportspeople from Cedar Rapids, Iowa